Hymns from the Heart is the seventh studio album and the second gospel album by American singer Johnny Cash, released on April 2, 1962. It features a selection of gospel songs, and is the second album of this type released by Cash, the first being Hymns by Johnny Cash. Cash later recorded many more gospel albums, including Sings Precious Memories and Believe in Him, among others.  This album has a more traditional hymn/gospel feel than Cash's previous hymns album.

Cover imagery
The album cover photograph was made by Leigh Wiener at Gene Autry's Melody Movie Ranch in Newhall, Santa Clarita, California.

Track listing

Personnel
 Johnny Cash - vocals, acoustic guitar, rhythm guitar
The Tennessee Three
 Luther Perkins - electric guitar, lead guitar
 Marshall Grant - bass
 W.S. Holland - drums
Additional musicians
 Billy Strange - guitar 
 Ray Edenton - guitar
 Buddy Clark - bass
 Irving Kluger - drums
 Floyd Cramer - piano
 Bill Pursell - organ
 Billy Lathum - banjo
 Marvin Hughes, Hubert Anderson - vibes
 Elliot Fisher, Anthony Olson, Frank Green, Olcott Vail, Joseph Livotti, Bobby Bruce - violin
 Gary White, Myron Sander - viola
 William E. Liebert - leader

References

Hymns from the Heart
Hymns from the Heart
Hymns from the Heart
Hymns from the Heart